Fenwick is a civil parish in the metropolitan borough of Doncaster, South Yorkshire, England.  The parish contains seven listed buildings that are recorded in the National Heritage List for England.  All the listed buildings are designated at Grade II, the lowest of the three grades, which is applied to "buildings of national importance and special interest".  Apart from the small village of Fenwick, the parish is entirely rural, and all the listed buildings are farmhouses or farm buildings.


Buildings

References

Citations

Sources

Lists of listed buildings in South Yorkshire
Buildings and structures in the Metropolitan Borough of Doncaster